Next to Nothing is the debut studio album of Nicky Skopelitis, released on 1989 through Venture.

Track listing

Personnel 
Musicians
Ginger Baker – drums
Aïyb Dieng – percussion
Fred Frith – violin
Bill Laswell – bass guitar, production
Simon Shaheen – Oud, violin
Nicky Skopelitis – guitar, production
Production and additional personnel
Martin Bisi – mixing, recording
Oz Fritz – assistant engineering
Thi-Linh Le – cover art, photography
Robert Musso – recording
Howie Weinberg – mastering

References

External links 
 

1989 debut albums
Albums produced by Bill Laswell
Nicky Skopelitis albums